The Veil is an American horror/supernatural anthology television series hosted by and starring Boris Karloff and produced in 1958 by Hal Roach Studios, very similar to Alcoa Presents: One Step Beyond. The series was created by Frank P. Bibas (1917-1997). 

Production was abandoned after a pilot and ten episodes had been made, which were never broadcast nor shown in syndication. However the episodes were later compiled into three feature-length films which were broadcast on late night TV in the 1960s and later released to VHS home video. 

The complete original series has since been released in its original format on DVD from Shout! Factory / Timeless Media retitled Tales of the Unexplained.

Production
The series was hosted by Karloff, who also acted in every episode but one (Jack the Ripper). Episode plots supposedly were based upon real-life reports of supernatural happenings and the unexplained. Ten of the 12 episodes begin and end with Karloff standing in front of a roaring Gothic fireplace and inviting viewers to find out what lies "behind the veil". Karloff began each episode with the following line: "Good evening. Tonight I'm going to tell you another strange and unusual story of the unexplainable which lies behind The Veil". 

Guest stars (aside from Karloff) included Whit Bissell, George Hamilton, Myron Healy, Patrick Macnee, Morris Ankrum, Denise Alexander, Torin Thatcher, Niall MacGinnis and others. Directors included Herbert L. Strock, Frank P. Bibas, Paul Landres, Arthur Hiller and George Waggner. 

Hailed by critics as "the greatest television series never seen" (according to DVD release publicity), The Veil was never broadcast. Troubles within the Hal Roach studio (and the collapse of a preliminary co-production arrangement with National Telefilm Associates) resulted in production being cancelled after only a pilot and 10 episodes were produced. Hal Roach purchased an additional episode called Jack the Ripper from a British TV studio in an attempt to fill out the series a bit, but the number of episodes was still considered too small to justify sale to a network or to syndication. (The "Jack the Ripper" episode was directed separately in England by David MacDonald.)

In the late 1960s, ten of the episodes were combined to form 3 different feature-length anthology films that aired on late night television. The three films were as follows:

The Veil (features 3 episodes): "Vision In Crime", "The Doctors", and "The Crystal Ball"
Jack the Ripper (features 4 episodes): "Jack The Ripper", "Food on the Table", "Genesis" and "Summer Heat"
Destination Nightmare (features 3 episodes): "Destination Nightmare", "Girl On The Road" and "The Return of Madame Vernoy"

For many years, it was thought that only those 10 episodes of The Veil had been produced, and that two extra titles that were cited in reference sources ("The Vestris" and "Whatever Happened to Peggy?") were just "alternate titles". "The Vestris" was a backdoor pilot for The Veil which aired separately as a 1958 episode of ABC-TV's anthology series Telephone Time and thus was the only episode ever aired. (Whatever Happened to Peggy? just disappeared from all of the later VHS video compilations for some unknown reason.)

Those same ten episodes were only released on VHS home video in their original format for the first time in the 1990s, and were subsequently released on DVD by Something Weird Video. But not even these collections included neither the pilot (The Vestris) or Whatever Happened to Peggy?.

However, in 2008, Timeless Media Group released a two-DVD set of The Veil, retitled Tales of the Unexplained, which included "The Vestris" and "Peggy" for a total of 12 episodes. Any DVD sets that are entitled The Veil however still do not include those two episodes for some reason.

In 1999, "Lifting the Veil of Mystery", a Tom Weaver article on the making of the series (complete with episode guide), appeared in issue #29 of Cult Movies magazine. It was later expanded into the book Scripts from the Crypt: The Veil (BearManor, 2017) which featured the series' history, scripts of several episodes, interviews with some of the participants, and a chapter on Boris Karloff's career as a TV anthology host. Contributors included Tom Weaver, Dr. Robert J. Kiss, and Barbara Bibas Montero, the daughter of the series' creator-producer, Frank Bibas.

Episodes
There are a total of 12 episodes in the series. There is no actual airing order, since only the pilot actually aired. (All episodes starring, and hosted by, Boris Karloff except for Jack the Ripper)

Trivia
 The only episode in which Karloff does not appear as a character in the story, as well as serving as the host, is "Jack the Ripper"; this episode was produced by a studio in England and was purchased by Hal Roach Studios to become the 12th episode. 
 Karloff's introductions for the episodes "Destination Nightmare" and "Whatever Happened to Peggy?" are set in a study, rather than in front of a fireplace like the others.
 Episodes were screened at the annual Mid-Atlantic Nostalgia Convention in Aberdeen, Maryland.

References

External links
 
 The Veil at CVTA with episode list

1950s American anthology television series
1958 American television series debuts
1958 American television series endings
American horror fiction television series
Television shows shot at Associated British Studios